Keren Regal (קרן רגאל; born January 23, 1977) is an Israeli former Olympic swimmer.

She competed for Israel at the 1992 Summer Olympics in Barcelona, Spain, at the age of 15. In the Women's 400 metres Individual Medley she came in 29th with a time of 5:07.97, in the Women's 200 metres Individual Medley she came in 37th with a time of 2:27.85, and in the Women's 50 metres Freestyle she came in 41st with a time of 27.93. As of 2012, she was the youngest Olympic participant ever for Israel.

References

External links
 

Israeli female swimmers
Living people
Swimmers at the 1992 Summer Olympics
Olympic swimmers of Israel
1977 births